Tuabad (also Romanized as Tūābād and To Abad; also known as Nowābād and Tūba) is a village in Kharaqan-e Sharqi Rural District, Abgarm District, Avaj County, Qazvin Province, Iran. At the 2006 census, its population was 509, in 127 families.

References 

Populated places in Avaj County